Lieutenant-Colonel Ferdinand Simeon Le Quesne, VC (25 December 1863 – 14 April 1950) was a British Army surgeon and recipient of the Victoria Cross, the highest and most prestigious award for gallantry in the face of the enemy that can be awarded to British and Commonwealth forces.

Details
Le Quesne was educated at King's College London before he joined the British Army as surgeon captain on 28 July 1886. After the Third Anglo-Burmese War, local leaders started a guerilla war against the British forces who now occupied the country. Le Quesne's action was during this period. He was 25 years old, and a surgeon in the Army Medical Service (later the Royal Army Medical Corps) serving with the Chin Field Force in Burma when the following deed took place for which he was awarded the VC.

Further information
Le Quesne served with the Chin-Lushai expeditionary force in 1890, and with the Wuntho Field Force in 1891, and was promoted to surgeon major on 28 July 1898. He served in the Second Boer War in South Africa, from which he returned in August 1902. He later served in World War I, and retired in 1918 with the rank of lieutenant colonel.

The medal
His VC is held at the Jersey Museum in St Helier.

References

Location of grave and VC medal (Avon)

1863 births
1950 deaths
Alumni of King's College London
Fellows of King's College London
Royal Army Medical Corps officers
British Army personnel of the Second Boer War
Victoria Cross recipients from Jersey
British Army recipients of the Victoria Cross